The Guardians of Hellenism (Greek: Έλληνες Ακρίτες) is a series of albums featuring recordings of traditional Greek music by region, performed by the Hellenic Music Archives Ensemble.

Albums 
Years of release are in parentheses
Vol. 1 (1998) - Chios, Mytilene, Samos, Ikaria
Vol. 2 (1998) - Lemnos, Samothrace, Imbros, Tenedos
Vol. 3 (1998) - Smyrna, Ionian Coast
Vol. 4 (1999) - Pontos, Cappadocia
Vol. 5 (2000) - Constantinople, Sea of Marmara, Bithynia
Vol. 6 (2000) - Thrace, Eastern Roumelia, Black Sea
Vol. 7 (2000) - Macedonia, Thassos
Vol. 8 (2000) - Epirus
Vol. 9 (2000) - Patmos, Kalymnos, Leros, Kos, Astypalea
Vol. 10 (2000) - Carpathos, Cassos, Castellorizo
Vol. 11 (2000) - Rhodes, Symi, Chalki, Tilos, Nisyros
Vol. 12 (2000) - Cyprus
Vol. 13 (2001)- Crete
Vol. 14 (2002)- Ionian Islands

See also
Music of Greece

References

Greek music
Compilation album series